Asghar Gahndchi (1928 – July 2019) was an Iranian entrepreneur known as the father of Iran's truck industry. He was the founder of Iran Kaveh (Saipa Diesel), the first trailer and truck manufacturing company without a foreign-assisted assembly line. 

Prior to the Islamic revolution in Iran, the shah's regime was interested in boosting the Iranian industry. As a result, the tendency was to favor companies with higher Iranian-built content.

Ghandchi was able to establish ties with Mack Trucks of the United States and started manufacturing trucks officially under their license.  His company soon grew to 1200 workers and he reached a capacity of roughly 2000 trucks per year.  Approximately 60% of these trucks were Iranian content while the rest was imported.

He had plans to start localizing the remaining 40% which included the engine as well.  However, in 1979, the Islamic revolution happened and his plans had to be postponed.

After the Iran–Iraq war, although he had lost his authority in his own company, he tried establishing another company called Kaveh Kar to provide after-sales service and maintenance to existing Mack Trucks in Iran.

Death 
Ghandchi died at the age 91 in July 2019.

Sources

Iranian businesspeople
1928 births
2019 deaths
Date of birth missing
Date of death missing
Place of birth missing
Place of death missing